The AQUIND Interconnector is a proposed HVDC submarine power cable proposed to link France and England. It faces local opposition and is attracting controversy due to its environmental impact and links between the company's backers and the Conservative Party.

Current status
In January 2023, a decision by the then Business Secretary, Kwasi Kwarteng, to block the cable was overturned by judicial review. The decision is likely to be referred back to the current business secretary, Grant Shapps.

Route
The cable is proposed to run between the Lovedean substation in Hampshire in England to the Barnabos substation in the Normandy region of France. Landfall is proposed at Eastney in Portsmouth (UK), and Le Havre (France).

Specification
The HVDC link would consist of four main cables, together with two much thinner fibre optic cables for operational control and communications. HVDC involves lower transmission losses than the conventional alternating current (AC) technology used in most existing electricity networks. Land cables would be laid mainly under existing roads to minimize the environmental impact of the development.

The link was to be built as two separate 1,000MW circuits, each with their own control and protection systems and auxiliary power supplies. The DC circuits would run at 320kV, and operate as symmetrical monopoles. The project is expected to cost £1.1billion.

Controversy

Campaigners and local MPs have urged the cancellation of the project. The Portsmouth South MP Stephen Morgan claims that the cable and its associated data connections pose a risk to UK national security. The Guardian newspaper reported that the promoters of the project, Viktor Fedotov and Alexander Temerko, are both substantial donors to the Conservative party and MPs, and that "Three Conservative ministers have already had to recuse themselves from the decision-making process over the Aquind undersea cable because of their links to the company." Almost 10% of MPs have received donations from companies linked to Fedotov. The minister and peer Martin Callanan was a former director of Aquind and another peer, James Wharton is a consultant to the company. 

In October 2021, AQUIND vehemently denied any wrongdoing, and stated that it would "not stand silently and accept slander based on xenophobia and the principles of guilt by association." The company stated that it was considering taking legal action against the media involved.

After the development had been refused in January 2022, Temerko described Minister of State for Trade Policy Penny Mordaunt, who had represented constituents concerns with the development, as an "absolutely uncontrollable woman" and a "threat to national security". Mordaunt subsequently said the Conservative Party’s code of conduct should apply to all members including donors, and suggested that party colleagues should not accept funds from Temerko. Aquind and Temerko had donated £1.1 million to the Conservative Party, including to 21 MPs and ministers.

History
When the project was announced in June 2016, the company said that the project would come online in 2021.

In July 2019, Portsmouth Council formally objected to the plans, on the grounds that it would cause unacceptable disruption in a built-up area. Between February and April 2019, the company undertook a statutory consultation exercise. In November 2019, Aquind submitted a formal planning application for the link in the UK.

In June 2020, Aquind submitted to Ofgem and the Commission de Régulation de l'Energie (CRE) a request for partial exemption from Articles 19(2) and 19(3) of Regulation (EU) 2019/943 concerning Use of Revenues obligations, for a period of 25 years from the start of commercial operations. In December 2020, Ofgem and CRE published a joint consultation document; this consultation was intended to close on 29 January 2021. In January 2021, the CRE and Ofgem announced that they had discontinued a public consultation for the AQUIND Interconnector, as this exemption request process is only available to interconnector projects developed between EU member states, the UK ceased to be a member state and the Brexit transition period had ended.
  
In October 2020, there was a protest against the project in Portsmouth.

In November 2020, Aquind won an appeal in the General Court of the European Union against the Agency for the Cooperation of Energy Regulators' (ACER) decision to reject an application for exemption pursuant to Article 17 of Regulation (EC) No 714/2009.

On 26 January 2021, the French authorities in Normandy refused to give the project the green light.

In March 2021, the examination by Portsmouth City Council closed.

In May 2021, there was another protest in Portsmouth. The Conservative MP for Portsmouth North, Penny Mordaunt, called the proposals "sinister". The Labour MP for Portsmouth South, Stephen Morgan, also voiced his opposition. The following month, Mordaunt handed in a petition against the project. Another protest was planned for July 2021.

A final decision by the British government on whether to permit construction has been postponed several times. On 21 October 2021, the business secretary Kwasi Kwarteng set a new deadline of 21 January 2022 for deciding on the planning application.

After the decision in January 2021 by the French regional government in Normandy to refuse permission, the company stated that this "does not prevent AQUIND from securing the relevant French planning consents required to construct and operate AQUIND Interconnector".

In October 2021, after growing criticism, the company vowed to "continue the development of the AQUIND Interconnector project".

On 20 January 2022, the decision to refuse permission for the project was announced by Kwasi Kwarteng.

In January 2022, Business Secretary Kwasi Kwarteng refused permission for the project, stating that he was not satisfied that "more appropriate alternatives to the proposed route" had been fully considered. 
In November 2022, that ruling by the Business Secretary was the subject of a judicial review at the High Court brought by Aquind Ltd. Justice Lieven has reserved her decision.

In January 2023, the decision by Kwasi Kwarteng to block the cable was overturned by judicial review. Local MPs and the local campaign group reasserted their opposition to the plan.

References

External links
 
 Stop AQUINDprotest website.

Electrical interconnectors to and from Great Britain
Proposed electric power transmission systems
Proposed electric power infrastructure in the United Kingdom
Proposed electric power infrastructure in France
Nationally Significant Infrastructure Projects (United Kingdom)